Massam Glacier is a glacier,  long, flowing north between the Waldron Spurs and Longhorn Spurs to enter the Ross Ice Shelf, Antarctica, just east of the mouth of Shackleton Glacier. It was named by the Southern Party of the New Zealand Geological Survey Antarctic Expedition (1963–64) for D. Massam, a member of that party.

References

Glaciers of Dufek Coast